The Tinmal Mosque or Great Mosque of Tinmal (also spelled Tinmel or Tin Mal) is a 12th-century mosque located in the village of Tinmel in the High Atlas Mountains of Morocco. Although no longer operating as a mosque today, its remains are preserved as a historic site. It was built at the site where Ibn Tumart, the founder of the Almohad movement, was buried and it is considered an important example of Almohad architecture.

History 

Tinmel is located along the important High Atlas mountain pass known as Tizi-n-Test between Marrakesh to the north and the Sous region to the south. It was the first capital of the Almohad movement founded by Ibn Tumart. He established his followers here in 1124 or 1125 CE and it became the base from which they launched attacks on the Almoravids who ruled the region at the time. A first mosque was built here around this time or shortly after. When Ibn Tumart died in 1130 he was buried here and a religious sanctuary and pilgrimage site subsequently developed at the site of his tomb. Abd al-Mu'min, who took over leadership of the Almohads after him, decided to build a new mosque nearby or on the same site in 1148, as confirmed by historical documents of the time – although the foundation date of 1153-1154 CE (548 AH) given by the Rawd al-Qirtas is still cited by many. The new mosque most likely replaced the existing mosque of Tinmel that was present here. Construction of the mosque thus began very soon after the conquest of Marrakesh (1147) and the beginning of construction on the Kutubiyya Mosque there. The Tinmal Mosque's architecture demonstrates many similarities with the Kutubiyya and was likely designed and built by craftsmen from Marrakesh. The mosque was smaller in scale than other major Almohad mosques as it was designed for a small town, but it was nonetheless a pilgrimage site and subsequent Almohad rulers were buried near here as well. Later, as the Marinids wrested control of Morocco from them, the Almohads of Marrakesh made a final stand in Tinmel until their last leaders were defeated and captured here in 1275.

The mosque eventually fell into ruin and was partly restored in the mid-20th century. Today the mosque is no longer operating but is open to visitors as a historic site, also making it one of the few mosque buildings in Morocco that is open to non-Muslims.

Architecture

Exterior 
The building has a fortress-like exterior appearance with thick plain walls, which was characteristic of other Almohad mosques and buildings as well. It has a roughly quadrangular floor plan measuring 43 by 40 metres. A more unusual feature was the position and form of the minaret, located at the middle of its southern wall on top of the mihrab; a design feature which is not found in other historic mosques. The minaret has a rectangular base and projects outwards from the surrounding outer wall, but has a truncated or unfinished appearance, contrasting with the bold and monumental minarets of other Almohad mosques that came after (such the minaret of the Kutubiyya or the Giralda in Seville). The mosque has seven entrances: three on both its east and west sides and one central entrance to the north.

Interior 

Inside, the mosque has a typical hypostyle layout with an interior courtyard. The main prayer hall is divided into nine "naves" (running roughly north to south) by rows of pointed horseshoe arches. Another aisle, perpendicular to these rows of arches (running roughly east to west), runs along the southern wall (the qibla wall towards which worshippers prayed). The mosque is a notable example of the "T-plan" or "T-type" mosque which is found in earlier Almoravid architecture and was standard for later medieval Moroccan mosques: the aisle running parallel to the qibla wall and the middle nave leading to the mihrab, running perpendicular to that wall, are wider and more prominent than the other aisles of the mosque and thus draw a "T" shape in the floor plan of the building. The southern aisle of the qibla wall also features three muqarnas ("honeycomb" or "stalactite") cupolas: one at the middle, in front of the mihrab, and one at either end, at the southern corners of the mosque. Each cupola is also flanked by "lambrequin" or "muqarnas" arches below, whose intrados are enhanced with carved sebka, muqarnas, and palmette/seashell motifs. Multifoil arches also run along the northern edge of this aisle, further setting it apart from the rest of the mosque. All these decorative flourishes also served to emphasize the southern aisle and middle nave in the T-plan of the mosque. The rectangular courtyard (sahn) of the mosque occupies a large part of its northern section, corresponding to the width of the mosque's five middle naves and the length of three aisles of arches. It is surrounded on all sides by the arches of the prayer hall and its extensions.

The mihrab 
The mihrab (niche symbolizing the qibla), situated in the middle of the southern wall, is very similar in form and decoration to that of the Kutubiyya Mosque and other Almohad mosques, consisting of an octagonal alcove covered by a small muqarnas cupola. The wall surrounding the mihrab's opening is decorated with carved geometric and interlacing motifs. Unlike the Kutubiyya Mosque, the decorative capitals of the engaged columns around the mihrab are carved from stucco rather than marble. On either side of the mihrab are two tall arched openings: one led to a small chamber where the minbar (pulpit) was stored, while the other led to the imam's entrance at the eastern base of the minaret.

References

External Links 

 Images of Tinmal Mosque in Manar al-Athar digital photo archive resource

12th-century mosques
Mosques in Morocco
Almohad architecture
Al Haouz Province